was a town located in Kitatsugaru District in western Aomori Prefecture, Japan.

History
The town was also known as the birthplace of famed author Osamu Dazai. The area was part of Hirosaki Domain during the Edo period. After the Meiji Restoration, the village of Kanagi was created in 1898. It was raised to town status in 1920. In 1955, it annexed the neighboring villages of Kase and Kira.

On March 28, 2005, Kanagi, along with the neighboring village of Shiura (also from Kitatsugaru District), was merged into the expanded city of Goshogawara, and thus no longer exists as an independent municipality.

At the time of its merger, Kanagi had an estimated population of 10,557 and a population density of 83.8 persons per km². The total area was 125.97 km².

The town economy was dominated by commercial fishing and agriculture.

Geography
Kanagi was located in the center of the Tsugaru Peninsula, in an area known for severe winter weather conditions and blizzards. The Iwaki River ran through the town.

Neighboring municipalities
These were the neighboring municipalities of Kanagi just before its incorporation into Goshogawara.
Aomori
Goshogawara
Tsugaru
Nakasato – now part of Nakadomari
Yomogita

Transportation

Railway
 Tsugaru Railway 
 -  -  -

Highway

Notable people from Kanagi
Osamu Dazai - author
Yoshi Ikuzō - enka singer-songwriter

References

Dissolved municipalities of Aomori Prefecture
Goshogawara